Stenoma discrepans is a moth of the family Depressariidae. It is found in Peru.

The wingspan is about 22 mm. The forewings are whitish yellowish, beyond an irregular line from one-fourth of the dorsum to the costa near the apex light grey, the division suffused. The plical and second discal stigmata are minute and black. There is a semi-oval black spot on the middle of the costa and there is a very small black spot on the costa at four-fifths, where a slightly curved series of faint grey dots runs to the tornus and there is a terminal series of small black dots. The hindwings are light grey.

References

Moths described in 1925
Taxa named by Edward Meyrick
Stenoma